Tadeusz Michalik (born 16 February 1991) is a Polish Greco-Roman wrestler. He represented Poland at the 2020 Summer Olympics in Tokyo, winning a bronze medal in the men's Greco-Roman 97 kg event.

He competed in the 97kg event at the 2022 World Wrestling Championships held in Belgrade, Serbia.

Personal life
His older sister Monika Michalik won a bronze medal in Freestyle wrestling at the 2016 Summer Olympics.

References

External links 
 

 

1991 births
Living people
Sportspeople from Poznań
Polish male sport wrestlers
Olympic wrestlers of Poland
Wrestlers at the 2020 Summer Olympics
Olympic medalists in wrestling
Medalists at the 2020 Summer Olympics
Olympic bronze medalists for Poland
20th-century Polish people
21st-century Polish people